Drawing the Target Around the Arrow is the second studio album by American producer Caroline Polachek, released under the name CEP (her initials). It is Polachek's first release since the breakup of her band Chairlift just one month prior. The project was released on January 19, 2017 by Pannonica, (an imprint of Bella Union), as a surprise album. The album was announced by a tweet on January 18, and the album was released as a free download the next day. The album was promoted with a concert at National Sawdust with a twelve-person vocal choir.

Composition
Drawing the Target Around the Arrow differs from Polachek's earlier work in that it consists solely of minimal instrumental tracks. Polachek crafted the album using raw sine waves, as she has been growing bored of how "genre-specific" music had become and wanted to strip it down to its basic parts. She also liked the idea of creating "useful" music to wake up or do work to. The album's title comes from 18th century Jewish Lithuanian preacher Dubno maggid, explaining how he comes up with his fables. As Polachek summarized, "It's about honoring your impulses and working with what you have in front of you."

Critical reception

Thea Ballard of Pitchfork called the composition "generally unobtrusive, and the individual tracks often run together" and that "perhaps the most satisfying aspect of this release is its definitively non-linguistic form of expression".

Track listing

References

2017 albums
Albums produced by Caroline Polachek
Caroline Polachek albums
Surprise albums
Albums free for download by copyright owner
Instrumental albums
Minimal music albums
Ambient albums by American artists